The Kobyz (Qobyz;) or kylkobyz (qylqobyz;) is an ancient Turkic bowed string instrument, spread among Kazakhs, Karakalpaks, Bashkirs, and Tatars. The Kyrgyz variant is called the ).

The qobyz has two strings made of horsehair. The resonating cavity is usually covered with goat leather.

Traditionally kobyzes were sacred instruments, owned by shamans and bakses (traditional spiritual medics). According to legends, the kobyz and its music could banish evil spirits, sicknesses and death.

In Kazakh music 
In the 1930s, when the first folk instrument orchestras were established in the Soviet republic of Kazakhstan, a new kind of kobyz came into existence. It now had four metallic strings and thus became closer to a violin. Such a modernized kobyz can be used to play both Kazakh music and the most complicated works of violin literature. One of the few western musicians to use the kobyz is Trefor Goronwy.

While many Kazakh kobyz players and scholars theorize that bards accompanied themselves on the kobyz during recitation of epics, today a mainstay of the Kazakh kobyz repertoire is küi, which are short programatic pieces composed as instrumental narration or expression of emotion, often employing the purposeful imitation of sounds such as bird calls or horse hooves.

In Karakalpak music 

The kobyz is still played today by jyrau (one of the two types of Karakalpak bard), as accompaniment during recitation of epics and dastan. The kobyz punctuates spoken narrative, plays the melodic line in unison with the voice during the sung parts, supports sustained notes in the voice by repeatedly bowing the same note, and plays the melody when the jyrau is not singing.

The jyrau sings with a guttural, raspy timbre, in a style common to many nomadic groups of Central Asia, Mongolia, and Southern Siberia. Although this timbre was in the past associated with shamanic practice, living memory of this has died out, and modern jyrau instead interpret the timbre as a vocal imitation of the kobyz itself.

In Tatar music 

The art of kobyz flourished before the fall of the Kazan khanate in 1552 among Tatars and some other ethnic groups of Volga region. However, this art was preserved until the end of the 18th century among the Tatar dervishes. Today the instrument is used in various Tatar ethnic ensembles like Bermenchek etc. and it is studied in depth by a candidate of art history at the Kazan Conservatory .

In Kyrgyz music 

The kyl kyyak (Kyrgyz: кыл кыяк ) (sometimes spelt kyl kiak and sometimes without the 'kyl') is a  stringed musical instrument used in Kyrgyz music. The instrument is carved from a single piece of wood (typically apricot) and typically measures 60–70 cm. It has 2 strings, one to provide melody and the other resonance. The kyl kyyak is played vertically with a bow and can be played on horseback. The strings and bow are normally made from horse hair and many instruments feature a carved horse's head. This all reflects the importance of the horse in Kyrgyz rural culture.

See also

Music of Central Asia
Bağlama
Banhu
Byzantine Lyra, the bowed lyre of the Byzantine Empire
Chuurqin
Cobza
Dutar
Dombra
Erhu
Gadulka
Gudok
Gusle
Kamancheh
Kemenche
Komuz
Lute
Rebab
The lyra of Crete

References

External links
Kurmangazy Academic orchestra of national instruments
Trefor Goronwy

Necked bowl lutes
Drumhead lutes
Bowed instruments
Kazakhstani musical instruments
Kazakhstani culture
Continuous pitch instruments
Sacred musical instruments